Adonea is a genus of velvet spiders that was first described by Eugène Simon in 1873.  it contains only three species: A. algarvensis, A. algerica, and A. fimbriata.

References

Araneomorphae genera
Eresidae
Spiders of Africa
Spiders of Asia
Taxa named by Eugène Simon